Petrus Johannes Schotel (11 November 1808 – 23 July 1865) was a 19th-century marine painter from Northern Netherlands.

Biography
Schotel was born in Dordrecht. According to the RKD he was the son of Johannes Christiaan Schotel, in whose style he followed. He worked for several years as a drawing teacher at the marine school in Medemblik. He married and his daughter Petronella Elisabeth Schotel became a painter who followed his sister Christina Petronella Schotel, a still life and flower painter.  He died, aged 56, in Dresden, Germany.

The Schotel Family passed down their artistic talents throughout the generations. The smallest detail such as the signatures on artwork were formatted the same. Schotel signed his artwork with P.J Schotel as did his offspring.

Schotel had produced hundreds of various designs over his lifetime and to-date his work is being sold in auction houses internationally, specifically the Netherlands, Denmark and New York.

Descendants of Schotel live internationally, as they were split up during the coming World Wars. The Schotels relocated globally from The Netherlands, United Kingdom and even the United States. Spencer Schotel born 29 June 2004, in Hastings, England  is a descendant of Petrus Johannes Schotel, The Schotel's who moved to the United Kingdom was pre-world-war.

External links
 Google Arts and Culture Page

References

Petrus Johannes Schotel on Artnet
Petrus Johannes Schotel on Invaluable.

1808 births
1865 deaths
19th-century Dutch painters
Dutch male painters
Artists from Dordrecht
Dutch landscape painters
Dutch marine artists
19th-century Dutch male artists